Wikstroemia stenophylla is a shrub in the family Thymelaeaceae.  It is evergreen, and is found in China, specifically Sichuan.

Description
The shrub generally grows to a height of 0.2 to 0.8 meters, but can reach a height of up to 1.3 meters.  It flowers during summer and autumn, and grows at altitudes from 1600 to 2500 meters.

References

stenophylla